Frankenstadion Heilbronn is a multi-use stadium in Heilbronn, Germany.  It is currently used mostly for football matches and is the home stadium of FC Heilbronn. The stadium is able to hold 17,200 people.

References

Football venues in Germany
Sports venues in Baden-Württemberg